Diospage cleasa is a moth of the subfamily Arctiinae. It was described by Herbert Druce in 1883. It is found in Colombia and Ecuador.

References

Euchromiina
Moths described in 1883